Jaime Lages Covilhã, (born November 13, 1962) in Luanda, is an Angolan basketball coach.

2011 AfroBasket
Perhaps, his most notorious act occurred during the 2011 Africa Basketball Championship when, amid the competition, assistant coach Covilhã replaced a highly challenged head coach Michel Gomez in a failed attempt to secure the title.

See also 
 Angola national basketball team

References

External links
 Profile at FIBA.com

1963 births
Living people
Angolan basketball coaches